William Thomas Williams may refer to:
 Thomas Williams (Warrington MP) (1915–1986), British Labour Co-operative politician
 William T. Williams (born 1942), American painter
 William Thomas (Bill) Williams, FAA, OBE (1913–1995), English and Australian botanist and plant taxonomist, known for his work on algorithms for numerical taxonomy

See also
William Williams (disambiguation)
Thomas Williams (disambiguation)